During the 1891–92 season Hearts competed in the Scottish Football League, the Scottish Cup and the East of Scotland Shield.

Results

Friendlies

Scottish Football League

Scottish Cup

East of Scotland Shield

Rosebery Charity Cup

See also
List of Heart of Midlothian F.C. seasons

References

Statistical Record 91-92

External links
Official Club website

Heart of Midlothian F.C. seasons
Heart of Midlothian